The 1980 St. John's Redmen baseball team represented the St. John's University in the 1980 NCAA Division I baseball season. The Redmen played their home games at Redman Field. The team was coached by Joe Russo in his 7th year at St. John's.

The Redmen won the Northeast Regional to advance to the College World Series, where they went 1-2 and were eliminated by the California Golden Bears.

Roster

Schedule 

! style="" | Regular Season
|- valign="top" 

|- align="center" bgcolor="#ffcccc"
| 1 || March 23 || at  || J. O. Christian Field • Storrs, Connecticut || 0–4 || 0–1
|- align="center" bgcolor="#ccffcc"
| 2 || March 25 || at  || University Field • Hempstead, New York || 9–0 || 1–1
|-

|- align="center" bgcolor="#ccffcc"
| 3 || April 2 || at  || Jack Coffey Field • New York, New York || 15–3 || 2–1
|- align="center" bgcolor="#ccffcc"
| 4 || April 3 || at  || Bainton Field • Piscataway, New Jersey || 8–2 || 3–1
|- align="center" bgcolor="#ccffcc"
| 5 || April 8 || at  || Unknown • Williamsburg, Virginia || 4–2 || 4–1
|- align="center" bgcolor="#ccffcc"
| 6 || April 9 || at  || Unknown • Norfolk, Virginia || 3–2 || 5–1
|- align="center" bgcolor="#ffcccc"
| 7 || April 10 || at Old Dominion || Unknown • Norfolk, Virginia || 3–4 || 5–2
|- align="center" bgcolor="#ffcccc"
| 8 || April 11 || at Old Dominion || Unknown • Norfolk, Virginia || 6–7 || 5–3
|- align="center" bgcolor="#ccffcc"
| 9 || April 11 || at Old Dominion || Unknown • Norfolk, Virginia || 14–7 || 6–3
|- align="center" bgcolor="#ccffcc"
| 10 || April 12 || at  || Malcolm U. Pitt Field • Richmond, Virginia || 12–11 || 7–3
|- align="center" bgcolor="#ffcccc"
| 11 || April 12 || at Richmond || Malcolm U. Pitt Field • Richmond || 1–2 || 7–4
|- align="center" bgcolor="#ffcccc"
| 12 || April 13 || at  || Unknown • Richmond, Virginia || 1–7 || 7–5
|- align="center" bgcolor="#ccffcc"
| 13 || April 13 || at VCU || Unknown • Richmond, Virginia || 16–4 || 8–5
|- align="center" bgcolor="#ccffcc"
| 14 || April 14 || at  || Unknown • New York, New York || 4–3 || 9–5
|- align="center" bgcolor="#ccffcc"
| 15 || April 16 ||  || Redman Field • New York, New York || 25–6 || 10–5
|- align="center" bgcolor="#ccffcc"
| 16 || April 18 || at  || Unknown • New York, New York || 9–1 || 11–5
|- align="center" bgcolor="#ccffcc"
| 17 || April 19 || at  || Alumni Baseball Diamond • Fairfield, Connecticut || 5–1 || 12–5
|- align="center" bgcolor="#ccffcc"
| 18 || April 20 || at  || Erny Field • Philadelphia, Pennsylvania || 7–2 || 13–5
|- align="center" bgcolor="#ffcccc"
| 19 || April 21 ||  || Redman Field • New York, New York || 1–2 || 13–6
|- align="center" bgcolor="#ccffcc"
| 20 || April 22 ||  || Redman Field • New York, New York || 14–0 || 14–6
|- align="center" bgcolor="#ccffcc"
| 21 || April 23 ||  || Redman Field • New York, New York || 13–3 || 15–6
|- align="center" bgcolor="#ccffcc"
| 22 || April 24 ||  || Redman Field • New York, New York || 9–5 || 16–6
|- align="center" bgcolor="#ccffcc"
| 23 || April 25 || at  || Beaver Field • University Park, Pennsylvania || 5–1 || 17–6
|- align="center" bgcolor="#ffcccc"
| 24 || April 26 || at Penn State || Beaver Field • University Park, Pennsylvania || 4–6 || 17–7
|- align="center" bgcolor="#ccffcc"
| 25 || April 30 || at  || Redman Field • New York, New York || 10–2 || 18–7
|-

|- align="center" bgcolor="#ccffcc"
| 26 || May 5 || St. Francis || Redman Field • New York, New York || 9–1 || 19–7
|- align="center" bgcolor="#ccffcc"
| 27 || May 6 ||  || Redman Field • New York, New York || 5–2 || 20–7
|- align="center" bgcolor="#ccffcc"
| 28 || May 10 || at Delaware || Bob Hannah Stadium • Newark, Delaware || 3–2 || 21–7
|- align="center" bgcolor="#ccffcc"
| 29 || May 11 || at  || Bill Clarke Field • Princeton, New Jersey || 7–3 || 22–7
|- align="center" bgcolor="#ffcccc"
| 30 || May 11 || at Princeton || Bill Clarke Field • Princeton, New Jersey || 4–5 || 22–8
|-

|-
! style="" | Postseason
|- valign="top"

|- align="center" bgcolor="#ccffcc"
| 31 || May 16 || vs  || Unknown • Unknown || 6–5 || 23–8
|- align="center" bgcolor="#ffcccc"
| 32 || May 17 || vs  || Unknown • Unknown || 0–4 || 23–9
|- align="center" bgcolor="#ccffcc"
| 33 || May 17 || vs  || Unknown • Unknown || 11–8 || 24–9
|- align="center" bgcolor="#ccffcc"
| 34 || May 18 || vs Buffalo || Unknown • Unknown || 14–1 || 25–9
|- align="center" bgcolor="#ccffcc"
| 35 || May 18 || vs Buffalo || Unknown • Unknown || 9–8 || 26–9
|-

|- align="center" bgcolor="#ccffcc"
| 36 || May 22 || vs  || Unknown • Orono, Maine || 6–4 || 27–9
|- align="center" bgcolor="#ccffcc"
| 37 || May 23 || vs  || Unknown • Orono, Maine || 9–5 || 28–9
|- align="center" bgcolor="#ccffcc"
| 38 || May 25 || vs Harvard || Unknown • Orono, Maine || 6–4 || 29–9
|-

|- align="center" bgcolor="#ccffcc"
| 39 || May 30 || vs Arizona || Johnny Rosenblatt Stadium • Omaha, Nebraska || 6–1 || 30–9
|- align="center" bgcolor="#ffcccc"
| 40 || June 1 || vs Hawaii || Johnny Rosenblatt Stadium • Omaha, Nebraska || 2–7 || 30–10
|- align="center" bgcolor="#ffcccc"
| 41 || June 2 || vs  || Johnny Rosenblatt Stadium • Omaha, Nebraska || 5–8 || 30–11
|-

Awards and honors 
Paul Maruffi
 All Tournament Team

References 

St. John's Red Storm baseball seasons
St. John's Redmen baseball
College World Series seasons